Events from the year 1630 in Denmark.

Incumbents 
 Monarch – Christian IV

Events
 27 March  The first regulation regarding the Dannebrog Splitflag in which King Christian IV ordered that Norwegian Defensionskibe (armed merchants ships) may only use the Splitflag if they are in Danish war service.

Undated
 A new building for Vartov Hospital is constructed at present-day Trianglen outside Copenhagen's Eastern City Gate.

Culture

Art
 Jørgen Ruingnis completes an elaborately carved nwq pulpit for Nakskov Church.

Births
 7 April – Ulrik Christian Gyldenløve, commander-in-chief of the Danish army (died 1658)
 16 April  – Lambert van Haven, architect (died 1695)

Full date missing
 Jørgen Hansen Burchart, fovernor of Norway (died c. 1700)
 Caius Gabriel Cibber, sculptor (died 1700)

Deaths 
 25 June – Jacob Ulfeldt, politician (born 1567)

References 

 
Denmark
Years of the 17th century in Denmark